Ferdinand "Pic" Cattini (27 September 1916 in Grono, Switzerland – 17 August 1969 in Davos, Switzerland) was a Swiss ice hockey player who competed in the  1936 Winter Olympics and 1948 Winter Olympics.

Personal life
Cattini was born on 27 September 1916 in Grono, Switzerland. He grew up alongside his brother Hans Cattini. He was nicknamed "Pic" due to his short stature. He worked as an electrician tradesman in Davos, Switzerland for teammate Albert Geromini.

Playing career
Starting in 1933, Cattini, his brother, and Bibi Torriani played on a forward line known as "The ni-storm", for HC Davos. The line was named for the last syllable (-ni) of players' surnames. The ni-storm was regarded as the top line of HC Davos and Switzerland's national hockey team. As a member of HC Davos, "The ni-storm" won 15 Swiss championship titles. This line consistently competed against Gebhard Poltera and his line from EHC Arosa. Cattini developed a reputation as an on ice enforcer. He retired from HC Davos in 1956 and took over coaching duties from 1952 to 1962.

He was inducted into the International Ice Hockey Federation Hall of Fame in 1998.

International play
In 1936, he participated with the Swiss ice hockey team in the Winter Olympics tournament. In 1948, he participated with the Swiss ice hockey team in the Winter Olympics tournament where he won a bronze medal. During the tournament, Switzerland held a 6–2 record. In total, Cattini won six European Championships. He also participated in two Olympic Games and seven IIHF World Championships.

In 2019, Patrik Laine surpassed Cattini's record for most goals scored by an 18-year-old at the IIHF World Championship.

Death and legacy
He died at the age of 52 from a long-term illness. The Spengler Cup dedicated a division in his name.

In 2020, he was introduced in to the IIHF All-Time Switzerland Team.

Playing statistics

International play
Per stats available on eliteprospect.com

International

See also
List of Olympic men's ice hockey players for Switzerland

References

External links

1916 births
1969 deaths
Ice hockey players at the 1936 Winter Olympics
Ice hockey players at the 1948 Winter Olympics
IIHF Hall of Fame inductees
Medalists at the 1948 Winter Olympics
Olympic bronze medalists for Switzerland
Olympic ice hockey players of Switzerland
Olympic medalists in ice hockey
People from Moesa District
Swiss ice hockey forwards
Sportspeople from Graubünden